The Mexican mud turtle (Kinosternon integrum), is a species of mud turtle in the family Kinosternidae. Endemic to Mexico, it is found in Aguascalientes, Colima, Durango, Guanajuato, Guerrero, Hidalgo, Jalisco, Michoacán, México, Morelos, Nayarit, Oaxaca, Puebla, Queretaro, San Luis Potosí, Sinaloa, Sonora, Tamaulipas and Zacatecas, where they inhabit moist environments, such as shallow ponds, lakes, rivers or intermediate temp. tropical forest areas.

Reproduction 
The Mexican mud turtle's nesting season lasts from early May to September, beginning just prior to the summer rainy season. A typical clutch size for each female is 2 to 4 eggs, but can range between 1 and 8. Another distinctive feature within the species is the nostrils on male and female turtles. The females have a more rounded nostril and the nostril is more brownish as to yellow like the male. The Mexican mud turtle is an organism that "bet hedges" meaning that its organism fitness varies depending on the condition it is in. When in a relaxed, every-day state, its fitness levels are low, however when stressed its fitness level increases. Bet hedging affects this organism's reproductive window as well, allowing it to only reproduce every two to three seasons.

Diet 
Mexican mud turtles are omnivores. Some of the plants consumed include: Filamentous algae, grass seeds, guava seeds, etcetera. Some of the animals consumed include: Ants, wasps, bees, etcetera. It has been found that during the dry seasons, females tend to eat more plant matter than males.

References

Sources 
 Le Conte, 1854: "Description of four new species of Kinosternum". Proceedings of the Academy of Natural Sciences of Philadelphia. 7: 180–190.

Macip-Ríos, Rodrigo & Zuñiga Vega, Jaime & Brauer Robleda, Pablo & Casas-Andreu,  Gustavo (2011). "Demography of two populations of the Mexican mud turtle (Kinosternon integrum) in central Mexico". Herpetological Journal. 21.

Kinosternon
Turtles of North America
Endemic reptiles of Mexico
Least concern biota of Mexico
Reptiles described in 1854